This is a list of August Strindberg's written works.

See also
August Strindberg paintings

Bibliography

Drama

Posthumous
 The growth of a soul, translated by Claud Field, 1913
 På gott och ont (Of Good and Evil), 1914
 Genom öknar till arvland; eller, Moses (Through the Wilderness to the Promised Land; or, Moses) (Through Deserts to Ancestral Lands ), twenty-one tableaux, 1918
 Hellas; eller, Sokrates (Hellas; or, Socrates) (Hellas ), nineteen tableaux, 1918
 Lammet och vilddjuret; eller, Kristus (The Lamb and the Wild Beast; or, Christ) (The Lamb and the Beast ), fifteen tableaux, 1918
 Toten-Insel (Isle of the Dead), one scene, 1918
 Han och hon: En själs utvecklingshistoria (He and She: A soul's development history), 1919
 Efterspelet (Epilogue), 1920
 Strindbergs brev till Harriet Bosse: Natur & Kultur, 1932
 August Strindbergs och Ola Hanssons brevvåxling, 1938
 Åttitalsnoveller (Stories of the eighties), 1959
 Det sjunkande Hellas (Greece in Decline), three-act verse, 1960
 Brev till min dotter Kerstin, letters, 1961
 Ur ockulta dagboken, journals, 1963, edited by Torsten Eklund
 Hövdingaminnen, illustrations by Otte Sköld, 1963

Translations and adaptions
 Den starkare (1906), translated by Francis J. Ziegler as The Stronger in Poet Lore (V.17, n.1)
 Svanevit (1909),  translated by Francis J. Ziegler as Swanwhite
 Fordringsägare (1910), translated by Francis J. Ziegler as The Creditor
 Moderskärlek (1910), translated by Francis J. Ziegler as Mother Love
 Inför döden  (1911), translated by Olive Johnson as Facing Death
 Fröken Julie (1912), translated by Charles Recht as Countess Julia
 Paria (1912), translated by Bjoerkman and published in Plays by August Strindberg: Creditors, Pariah
 Le Plaidoyer d'un fou (1912), translated by Ellie Schleussner as  The Confession of a Fool
 Inferno (1912), translated by Claud Field as The Inferno
 Giftas (1913), translated by Ellie Schleussner as Married
 Tjänstekvinnans son (1913), translated by Claud Field as The Son of a Servant, intro by Henry Vacher-Burch
 I havsbandet (1913), translated by Elizabeth Clarke Westergren as On the Seaboard: A Novel of the Baltic Islands
 Historiska miniatyrer (1913), translated by Claud Field as Historical Miniatures
 I havsbandet (1913), translated by Ellie Schleussner  as By the Open Sea
 En blå bok (1913), translated by Claud Field as Zones of the Spirit: A Book of Thoughts, intro by Arthur Babillotte
 Samum (1914), translated by Horace B. Samuel and published in Paria [and] Simoon
 Advent: Ett mysterium (1914), translated by Claud Field as Advent
 På gott och ont (1914), translated by Claud Field as The Martyr of Stockholm
 Sagor (1930), translated by  L. J. Potts as Tales
 Erik XIV (1931), translated by Joan Bulman and published in Master Olof and Other Plays
 Fröken Julie (1950), translated by  C. D. Locock as Lady Julie
 Kristina,Carl XII, and Gustav III (1955), translated by W. Johnson and published in Queen Christina, Charles XII, [and] Gustav III
 Gustav Adolf (1957), translated by Walter Johnson as Gustav Adolf
 Påsk (1957), translated by Elizabeth Sprigge as Easter
 Hemsöborna (1959), translated by Elspeth Harley Schubert as The People of Hemso
 Öppna brev till Intima Teatern (1959), translated by W. Johnson as Open Letters to the Intimate Theatre
 Strindbergs brev till Harriet Bosse: Natur & Kultur (1959), translated by Arvid Paulson as Letters of Strindberg to Harriet Bosse
 Fröken Julie (1961), translated by E. M. Sprinchorn as Miss Julie
 Inferno (1912), translated by Mary Sandbach as Inferno
 Leka med elden (1963), translated by Michael Meyer as Playing With Fire
 Fröken Julie (1965), adapted by Ned Rorem as Miss Julie (opera)
 Hemsöborna (1965), translated by Arvid Paulson as Natives of Hemsö
 Ur ockulta dagboken (1965), translated by Mary Sandbach as From an Occult Diary: Marriage with Harriet Bosse
 Dödsdansen (1966), translated by Norman Ginsbury as The Dance of Death
 Tjänstekvinnans son (1966) translated by E. M. Sprinchorn as The Son of a Servant: The Story of the Evolution of a Human Being (1849–1867)
 Le Plaidoyer d'un fou (1967), translated by E. M. Sprinchorn as A Madman's Defense
 Syndabocken (1967), translated by Arvid Paulson as The Scapegoat
 Le Plaidoyer d'un fou (1968), translated by Anthony Swerling as A Madman's Manifesto
 Dance of Death (film) (1969), film starring Laurence Olivier
 Klostret (1969), translated by Mary Sandbach as The Cloister
 Miss Julie (1971); this version starred Helen Mirren
 Ensam (1971), translated by Arvid Paulson as Days of Loneliness
 Giftas (1972), translated by  Mary Sandbach as Getting Married
 Sömngångarnätter och vakna dagar (verse) (1978) adapted by Arvid Paulson as Sleepwalking Nights and Wide-Awake Days and Biographical
 Taklagsöl (1987), translated by David Mel Paul and Margareta Paul in The Roofing Ceremony and The Silver Lake (another short story by Strindberg)
 En häxa (1991), translated by Mary Sandbach as A Witch
 Kaspers Fet-Tisdag – ett Fastlagspel (2011), translated by Jonathan Howard as Casper's Fat Tuesday
 Herr Bengts hustru (2011), translated by Laurence Carr and Malin Tybåhl as Mr. Bengt’s Wife
 Erik XIV (2011), Karl II (2012) and Gustav Adolf (2013), translated by Wendy Weckwerth

Poetry, fiction, other, autobiography and other

 From Fjerdingen and Svartbäcken, short stories, 1877
 The Red Room, novel, 1879
 Gamla Stockholm (Old Stockholm), with Claes Lundin, cultural history, 1880
 I Vårbrytningen: Ungdomsarbeten, for children, Volumes I-VI, 1881
 Kulturhistoriska studier, 1881
 Dikter och verkligheter (Poems and Realities), verse and prose, 1881
 Svenska folket i helg och söcken, i krig och i fred, hemma och ute; eller, Ett tusen år av svenska bildningens och sedernas historia (The Swedish People on Holy Day and Everyday, in War and Peace, at Home and Abroad; or, A Thousand Years of the History of Swedish Culture and Manners), illustrations by Carl Larsson and C. E. Fritze, Volume I, 1881 and volume II, 1882
 Det nya riket (The New Kingdom), essay, 1882
 Svenska öden och äventyr (Swedish Destinies and Adventures), novel, 1883
 Dikter på vers och prosa (Poems in Verse and Prose), 1883
 Likt och olikt, 1884
 Sömngångarnätter och vakna dagar (verse), 1884
 August Strindbergs lilla katekes för underklassen, ≈1884
 Giftas (Married), two volumed short stories,  Schleussner 1884–1886
 Kvarstadsresan (Journey into Detention), autobiography, 1885
 Utopier i verkligheten (Utopias in Reality), short stories, 1885
 Jäsningstiden (Time of Ferment), autobiographical novel, 1886
 Tjänstekvinnans son (The Son of a Servant), autobiography, 1886–1909
 Hemsöborna (The People of Hemsö), novel, 1887
 Vivisectioner, (Vivisections), essays includes On Psychic Murder, 1887
 Blomstermaalningar och djurstycken ungdomen tillaegnade (Flowers and Animals), popular science, 1888
 The Defence of a Fool (Le Plaidoyer d'un fou), 1888
 Tschandala, novel, 1888
 Skaerkarlslif: Beraettelser (Life in the Skerries), short story, 1888
 Bland franska boender (Among French Peasants), non-fiction, 1889
 Om modern drama och modern teater (On Modern Drama and the Modern Theatre), essay, 1889
 En haxa (A Witch), novel, 1890
 I havsbandet, novel, 1890
 Tryckt och otryckt (Printed and unprinted), plays, essays, and other writings, 1890–1897
 Les Relations de la France avec la Suede jusqu'a nos jours, 1891
 Antibarbarus, essays, 1892
 Jardin des plantes (Botanical Gardens), science, 1896
 Hortus Merlini: Lettres sur la chimie; Sylva sylvarum, 1897
 Inferno, novel/autobiography, 1897
 Svensk natur (Swedish Nature), 1897
 Legender (Legends: Autobiographical Sketches), 1898
 Klostret (Monastery), novel,1898
 Typer och prototyper inom mineralkemien: Festskrift till firandet af Berzelii femtioaarsminne, 1898
 Jakob brottas (Jacob Wrestling), journal, 1898
 Samvetsqval (Remorse), 1899
 Vaerldshistoriens mystik ((The Mysticism (or Mystique or Hidden Meaning) of World History)), essay, 1901
 Fagervik och Skamsund (Fair Haven and Foul Strand), 1902
 Ensam (Alone), novella,  1903
 Sagor (Fairy tales), stories, 1903
 Oeppna brev till Intima Teatern, essays, 1903
 Götiska rummen (Gothic Rooms), novel, 1904
 Historiska miniatyrer (Historical Thumbnails), fiction, 1905
 Ordalek och smaakonst (Word Play and Miniature Art), poems, 1905
 Taklagsoel, novella, 1907
 Syndabocken, novella, 1907
 Svarta fanor (Black Banners), novel, 1907
 Kammarspel, 1907
 En blaa bok (A Blue Book), essays and journal entries, four volumes, 1907–1912
 Fabler och smårre beråttelser (Fables and Minor Stories), 1909
 Shakespeares Macbeth, Othello, Romeo och Julia, Stormen, Kung Lear, Henrik VIII, En Midsommarnattsdröm (Shakespeare's Macbeth, Othello, Romeo and Juliet, The Tempest, King Lear, Henry VIII, A Midsummer Night's Dream), 1909
 Tal till Svenska Nationen om olust i landet, levernet, litteraturen och laerdomen ... Sjunde upplagan (Speeches to the Swedish Nation), 1910
 Författaren: En sjåls utvecklingshistoria (Author: A psychic development history), 1910
 Folkstaten: Studier till en stundande författningsrevision (People's State: Studies in a forthcoming Constitutional Court), 1910
 Modersmaalets anor (The Origins of Our Mother Tongue), essay,1910
 Vaerldspraakens roetter (The Roots of World Languages), 1910
 Religioes renaessans (Religious Renaissance), 1910
 Kina och Japan: Studier (China and Japan Studies), 1911
 Kinesiska språkets hårkomst (Chinese language descent), 1912
 Samlade skrifter (Collected Works), fifty-five volumes, edited by John Landquist

Notes

Resources

 
Bibliographies by writer
Bibliographies of Swedish writers
Dramatist and playwright bibliographies